Singer Laren is a museum and concert hall located in the center of Laren, the Netherlands. The museum is devoted to presenting and preserving the collection of the American artist William Henry Singer (1868–1943) and his wife Anna (1878–1962).

Laren School

William Henry Singer was the son of a steel baron of the same name who sold his company Pittsburgh Bessemer Steel Co. to Andrew Carnegie. Against the wishes of his father, young Singer became an artist and after marrying Anna Spencer-Brugh in 1895, he moved to Monhegan, Maine to join the artist colony there. His father was disappointed that he chose art rather than business and insisted he earn his living as an artist. His seascapes sold well, however, and together with the artist Martin Borgord, the couple traveled to Paris where they studied art at the Académie Julian in 1901. Attracted by the artist colony in Laren, made famous by the Dutch painters Jozef Israëls, Anton Mauve, Jacob Maris, Albert Neuhuys, and their pupils such as Matthijs Maris, Arina Hugenholtz, they decided to settle there. They were not the first foreigners to visit the artist colony in Laren; Max Liebermann, who often spent summers painting in the Netherlands, visited in the company of Isaac Israëls, Josef's son. The Singers knew them and others such as the pointillists Co Breman & Ferdinand Hart Nibbrig. They remained special friends with Martin Borgord, with whom they traveled to Norway. Other close friends were the painters Walter Griffin, Henri Le Sidaner and Jacob & Willem Dooijewaard.

In 1954 Singer's widow founded the Singer Memorial Foundation, and in 1956 the museum designed by the Dutch architect Wouter Hamdorff  (1890 - 1965)  was opened in an expansion of their home, "De Wilde Zwanen,"on the Oude Drift, with a new concert hall attached. An architecture competition for reconstruction of the complex was organized in 2012. The winners —young architects Sanne Oomen and denieuwegeneratie—were commissioned the project. The final design was prepared by Oomen Ontwerpt, Oscar Vos and Thomas Dieben (denieuwegeneratie, later KRFT) in collaboration with VDNDP architecten. Reconstruction was completed in 2017.

The museum hosts the Singer collection of paintings and sculpture and artifacts, by members of the Laren School, the Hague School (Pulchri Studio), and Bergen School (art), and also has examples of Expressionism. Some of the more prominent names in the collection acquired since 1956, are Bart van der Leck, Jan Sluijters, Leo Gestel, Chris Beekman, Jan Toorop, Mommie Schwarz, Mommie's wife Else Berg, Gustave De Smet and Herman Kruyder. The museum has a café and hosts regular visiting art exhibitions.

On the morning of 30 March 2020, a painting, The Parsonage Garden at Nuenen by Vincent van Gogh, on loan from the Groninger Museum, was stolen while the institution was closed to the public during the COVID-19 pandemic.

References

External links 
Website Singer Laren

Museums in North Holland
Modern art museums
Art museums established in 1956
Art museums and galleries in the Netherlands
Laren, North Holland
1956 establishments in the Netherlands
20th-century architecture in the Netherlands